Allan McNish (born 29 December 1969) is a British former racing driver, commentator, and journalist from Scotland. He is a three-time winner of the 24 Hours of Le Mans, most recently in 2013, as well as a three-time winner of the American Le Mans Series, which he last won in 2007. He won the FIA World Endurance Championship (FIA WEC) in 2013. He has also been a co-commentator and pundit for BBC Formula One coverage on TV, radio and online and was team principal of the Audi Sport ABT Schaeffler Formula E team.

Early life

McNish was born in Dumfries, Scotland and played football while at school. He was a fan of Nottingham Forest and also supported his local club Queen of the South. It was not until McNish began in karting that he found something at which he excelled.

Early career
McNish began his career in karting like fellow Dumfries and Galloway driver David Coulthard. McNish credited the start given to both of them and Dario Franchitti as being largely down to David Leslie senior and junior.

McNish and Coulthard both were recognised with a McLaren/Autosport BRDC Young Driver of the Year award having moved up to car racing. In 1988 he won the Formula Vauxhall Lotus championship and in 1989 finished runner up to David Brabham in a close fought British Formula 3 Championship. During the late 1980s McNish shared a house with teammate Mika Häkkinen.

Tipped as a future Formula One driver, he tested with both McLaren and Benetton, whilst also competing in F3000, then the recognised second tier of European motorsport, in 1990–1992. Whilst racing his first season in F3000, McNish suffered a crash at a race in Donington Park where a bystander was fatally injured. He went on to finish fourth overall in the championship that season. Concentrating on Formula One opportunities meant he appeared in F3000 only once during 1994, at Pau.

When a Formula One drive failed to materialise, he returned to F3000 in 1995 with Paul Stewart Racing (run by the son of Sir Jackie Stewart who went on to form Stewart Grand Prix). While he was arguably the fastest driver of the year, a series of mishaps saw him well beaten by Super Nova drivers Vincenzo Sospiri and Ricardo Rosset in the title race. McNish's career appeared to stall in early 1996 after a deal to race in Formula Nippon fell through and Mark Blundell was preferred for a drive with the PacWest CART team. He also tested for Benetton during the year.

Sports cars

Despite devoting his career to the pursuit of a Formula One chance, McNish has become one of the world's most highly rated sportscar drivers. His sportscar career began in 1996 with Porsche, at a time when their 911 GT1 model revolutionised sportscar racing. With the factory team he took this car to victory in the 1998 24 Hours of Le Mans, partnered by Laurent Aïello and Stephane Ortelli. He subsequently appeared for Toyota and Audi in the race, and after losing a likely victory in the dying stages of the 2007 event, scored a second triumph in 2008 with Tom Kristensen and Rinaldo Capello driving an Audi R10. He has also raced with great success for Audi in the American Le Mans Series, winning the title with Dindo Capello in 2006 and 2007, and taking four overall victories at the 12 Hours of Sebring (2004, 2006, 2009 and 2012). At the 2011 Le Mans McNish destroyed the car in a spectacular crash early in the race and ended the race for Audi No. 3. And again at the 2012 Le Mans, McNish made a driving error and lost a first place by crashing the Audi No. 2 car a few hours before the finish. He also codrove the No. 8 Starworks Motorsport Riley-Ford to a second-place finish at the 2012 24 Hours of Daytona.

In the 2000 American Le Mans Series season McNish set a track record for the full circuit configuration at Sears Point International Raceway.

Formula One

McNish finally found an opening into Formula One in 2001, when the newly formed Toyota F1 team required a development driver. Given his link with Toyota through sportscars he was an obvious choice for this role, and after impressing in testing he was hired to race for the season. He did not score any points during the season's 17 races, and he and teammate Mika Salo were replaced with a new line-up of Olivier Panis and Cristiano da Matta for 2003. Salo had scored points for the team on their debut in Melbourne and McNish had very nearly done the same in the Malaysian Grand Prix, only for a pit lane mistake by the team to cost him the result. Both drivers were told of their replacement before Da Matta was announced, and ITV's Martin Brundle commented that "replacing Salo and McNish with Panis and A.N. Other" was not, in his view, a step forward.

McNish had a dramatic accident at the 130R corner while practising for Toyota's home race the Japanese Grand Prix at Suzuka, but escaped serious injury. This led to the corner being reprofiled the following year.

After Formula One

In 2003 he was a test driver for Renault F1, also doing a little TV work for ITV, but the next year he returned to his successful sports car racing career, winning the 12 Hours of Sebring, combining this in 2005 with a venture into the highly competitive DTM (German Touring Car Championship), where he competed against the likes of former Formula One drivers Mika Häkkinen and Jean Alesi. He also won sportscar driver of the year awards from  Autosport and Le Mans magazines and the (Jackie) Stewart Medal Award for services to Scottish motor sport. He was made the president of the Scottish Motor Racing Club at their annual prize giving and dinner in 2007, succeeding Stewart.

In 2006, he continued racing with the Audi factory team and was part of the driving line-up which won the 12 Hours of Sebring in the new Audi R10 TDI diesel, setting pole position and breaking the lap record. In 2008, McNish won the 24 Hours of Le Mans for Audi alongside Tom Kristensen and Rinaldo Capello. It was his first win at la Sarthe since . McNish won the 2013 24 Hours of Le Mans as well with Tom Kristensen and Loïc Duval.  In 2011 McNish suffered a catastrophic crash at the Le Mans race, one which left his car virtually disintegrated.  However McNish walked away from the vehicle unharmed thanks largely due to the safety improvements that had been made in recent years.

In 2013, McNish became a world champion as he won the 2013 FIA World Endurance Championship alongside Kristensen and Duval.

Since Formula One has introduced the drivers' representative on the stewards panel at all Grands Prix, McNish has featured as the drivers' representative twice in the 2011 season, in Monaco and most recently in Hungary and on both occasions he has penalised the McLaren driver Lewis Hamilton for various transgressions. He has also appeared in a Scania video test driving their new R 730 V8.

On 17 December 2013, McNish announced his retirement from Audi Sport and from racing full-time. He has not ruled out racing individual events in the future. After retiring he took on a role with Audi Sport, including liaising between the team's drivers and engineers, between the team and motorsport organisers, and driver development. He is also manager of racing driver Harry Tincknell. He also works for BBC Sport as a commentator and pundit for their Formula One coverage. McNish became team principal for Audi's Formula E team, starting for the 2017–18 season, following Audi's official take over of the Abt Sportsline run entry.

McNish is two-time winner of the Segrave Trophy (2009/2014), was awarded the BRDC Gold Star in 2014, and won the BARC Gold Medal in 2015.

Other formulae
As well as those above, McNish has also raced in the following racing series:

 Karting
 Formula Ford
 Vauxhall Lotus
 British Formula 3
 North American GT
 FIA GT

Personal life

He lives in Monaco with his wife Kelly and their two children. Prior to his marriage, McNish's stag party in Dumfries was attended by Dario and Marino Franchitti and included watching a Queen of the South football match.
He speaks English and French.

Racing record

Complete International Formula 3000 results
(key) (Races in bold indicate pole position; races in italics indicate fastest lap.)

Complete 24 Hours of Le Mans results

Complete American Le Mans Series results

Complete 12 Hours of Sebring results

Complete Formula One results
(key)

 Driver did not finish the Grand Prix, but was classified as he completed over 90% of the race distance.

Complete DTM results
(key)

Complete Le Mans Series results

Complete FIA World Endurance Championship results

References

External links

 Allan McNish's official website
 Allan McNish's official blog
 Richard's F1 interview with Allan McNish
Profile – by FIA GT Championship official website

1969 births
Living people
Scottish Formula One drivers
Toyota Formula One drivers
Scottish racing drivers
British Formula Three Championship drivers
Deutsche Tourenwagen Masters drivers
FIA GT Championship drivers
24 Hours of Le Mans drivers
24 Hours of Le Mans winning drivers
American Le Mans Series drivers
International Formula 3000 drivers
Segrave Trophy recipients
European Le Mans Series drivers
People educated at St Joseph's College, Dumfries
Sportspeople from Dumfries
24 Hours of Daytona drivers
Rolex Sports Car Series drivers
FIA World Endurance Championship drivers
Motorsport announcers
British expatriates in Monaco
Formula E people
12 Hours of Sebring drivers
Karting World Championship drivers
Audi Sport drivers
Team Joest drivers
Toyota Gazoo Racing drivers
DAMS drivers
Oreca drivers
Abt Sportsline drivers
Paul Stewart Racing drivers
Porsche Motorsports drivers
Starworks Motorsport drivers